A partial solar eclipse occurred on February 25, 1971 with a magnitude of 0.7872. A solar eclipse occurs when the Moon passes between Earth and the Sun, thereby totally or partly obscuring the image of the Sun for a viewer on Earth. A partial solar eclipse occurs in the polar regions of the Earth when the center of the Moon's shadow misses the Earth. In this partial solar eclipse, the moon covered 78.7% of the sun.

Related eclipses

Solar eclipses of 1968–1971

Metonic series

References

External links 

1971 2 25
1971 in science
1971 2 25
February 1971 events